Veľká Hradná  is a village and municipality in Trenčín District in the Trenčín Region of north-western Slovakia. It lies at an altitude of 270 metres and the municipalitycovers an area of 11.881 km² with a population of about 656.

External links

Villages and municipalities in Trenčín District